Bal Bali (also Romanized as Bal Balī and Bal Balī; also known as Balelī, Baleylī, and Balīlī) is a village in Alamarvdasht Rural District, Alamarvdasht District, Lamerd County, Fars Province, Iran. At the 2006 census, its population was 77, in 22 families.

See also

Pini Balili (born 1979), Israeli footballer

References 

Populated places in Lamerd County